Bela Duarte is an artist from Cape Verde, Born in the island of São Vicente and was studied decorative arts in Lisbon, Portugal.  During the Portuguese Carnation Revolution in 1974, she returned to Cape Verde in Mindelo, together with Manuel Figueira and Luísa Queirós, she made the Cooperativa da Resistência (The Resistance Cooperative).  She saw the ethnological research, over arts and crafts and works from the Cape Verde Islands, making it today the greatest person in the archipelago.

Bela Duarte made her works and painted in oil and acrylic, batik maker, webbing and one other.  In 1992 along with Luisa Queiros created in a gallery in Mindelo "azul + azul = verde" for batik, craftsmanship and artist.

In the 1970s, Bela Duarte successfully took place in numerous art exhibitions in Cape Verde, Brussels, Portugal, Paris and the USA.  For her batik work in 1995, she was received by the national cultural institute the renominated Fonte Lima Prize.

References

External links
Photo of Bela Duarte at Mindelo Infos

20th-century Cape Verdean women singers
Living people
Singers from São Vicente, Cape Verde
Cape Verdean painters
Year of birth missing (living people)